The 1921 King's Birthday Honours in New Zealand, celebrating the official birthday of King George V, were appointments made by the King on the recommendation of the New Zealand government to various orders and honours to reward and highlight good works by New Zealanders. They were announced on 3 June 1921.

The recipients of honours are displayed here as they were styled before their new honour.

Knight Bachelor
 John Pearce Luke  – member of the House of Representatives, and formerly mayor of the City of Wellington.
 Brigadier-General Donald Johnstone McGavin    – director-general of medical services, New Zealand Military Forces.

Order of Saint Michael and Saint George

Knight Commander (KCMG)
 The Honourable Edwin Mitchelson  – member of the Legislative Council.

Companion (CMG)
 Frederick William Platts — of Te Kūiti; stipendiary magistrate, and formerly resident commissioner of the Cook Islands.
 Major James Lewis Sleeman . In recognition of services as director of military training, New Zealand Military Forces.

References

Birthday Honours
1921 awards
1921 in New Zealand
New Zealand awards